Puncticulis is a subgenus of sea snails, marine gastropod mollusks in the genus Conus, family Conidae, the cone snails and their allies.

In the latest classification of the family Conidae by Puillandre N., Duda T.F., Meyer C., Olivera B.M. & Bouchet P. (2015), Puncticulis has become a subgenus of Conus as Conus (Puncticulis) Swainson, 1840 (type species: Conus arenatus Hwass in Bruguière, 1792) represented as Conus Linnaeus, 1758

Species
 Puncticulis arenatus (Hwass in Bruguière, 1792) represented as Conus arenatus Hwass in Bruguière, 1792 (alternate representation)
 Puncticulis pulicarius (Hwass in Bruguière, 1792) represented as Conus pulicarius Hwass in Bruguière, 1792 (alternate representation)
 Puncticulis zeylanicus (Gmelin, 1791) represented as Conus zeylanicus Gmelin, 1791 (alternate representation)
 Conus (Puncticulis) caracteristicus Fischer von Waldheim, 1807 represented as Conus caracteristicus Fischer von Waldheim, 1807
 Conus (Puncticulis) vautieri Kiener, 1847 represented as  Conus vautieri Kiener, 1847

References

External links
 To World Register of Marine Species

Conidae
Gastropod subgenera